Madalyn Todd Aslan (born October 5, 1963) is an American-British writer, astrologer, and palmist. She is the author of What's Your Sign?, Madalyn Aslan's Jupiter Signs, and the forthcoming Naked Mother. The New York Times dubbed her "The Love Guru".

Madalyn has been featured on The Today Show, The Oprah Winfrey Show, PBS, Biography, BBC, CNN and other specials. Her horoscopes have been translated into seven languages, and she has published daily columns in The Washington Post, New York Daily News, Daily Mail and others. She is included in Who's Who in America and Who's Who in the World and is the only psychic to have her readings auctioned at Christie's.

References

Further reading

External links
 
 

1963 births
Living people

20th-century astrologers
21st-century astrologers
20th-century American women writers
20th-century American non-fiction writers
21st-century American women writers
American astrologers
American astrological writers
People educated at South Hampstead High School
Cornell University alumni
Sarah Lawrence College alumni
Writers from New York City
American women non-fiction writers